The Opening Cup, is the trophy awarded to the winner of the first game of every regular season of the Kontinental Hockey League (KHL). This match is played between the previous season's playoff champion (Gagarin Cup Winner) and the previous season's Continental Cup winner. The game is played on the home ice of the previous season's playoff champion.

History
During the first season of the KHL, the match was played between the winner and runner-up of the 2007–08 playoffs of the Russian Superleague.

The Western Conference in the 2010 Opening Cup game was represented by UHC Dynamo because the 2009–10 Western Conference champion, HC MVD, merged with Dynamo Moscow to form the new team after the 2009–10 season. On September 10, 2011, three days after the 2011 Lokomotiv Yaroslavl plane crash disaster, the KHL head office decided to honor the deceased in the 2011 Opening Cup.

Winners

Appearances

Notes and references

External links
 Official September 2013 Opening Cup match gallery (photo contains the trophy)
 Official September 2013 Opening Cup match gallery (photo contains the trophy)

Kontinental Hockey League trophies and awards